"Steer" is the first single from Australian singer-songwriter Missy Higgins' second album, On a Clear Night (2007). The song was released in Australia on 14 April 2007 and became the most-added track that same week. Higgins stated that the song is "about steers" and that she wrote it after overlooking the southern celestial hemisphere from a bay in Western Australia. The song has instrument backings of acoustic guitar and drums.

The single reached the number-one spot on the Australian Singles Chart in the first week of its release, dethroning Avril Lavigne's "Girlfriend" for a single week. It became Higgins' second number-one single, after 2004's "Scar". At the end of 2007, the song appeared at number 60 on the Australian year-end chart, receiving a gold certification from the Australian Recording Industry Association (ARIA) for sales exceeding 35,000 copies.

In March 2007, Higgins gave fans the exclusive opportunity to pre-order a personally signed copy of her single "Steer" via SMS.

Track listing
 "Steer" – 3:53
 "Dusty Road" – 3:14
 "The Battle" – 2:17
 "Leave a Note" (demo) – 3:43

Charts

Weekly charts

Year-end charts

Certifications

Release history

References

2007 singles
2007 songs
Eleven: A Music Company singles
Missy Higgins songs
Number-one singles in Australia
Song recordings produced by Mitchell Froom
Songs written by Missy Higgins